Grossmann's gecko (Gekko grossmanni), also known commonly as the marbled gecko, is a species of lizard in the family Gekkonidae. The species is endemic to Vietnam.

Etymology
The specific name, grossmanni, is in honor of German herpetologist Wolfgang Grossmann.<ref>Beolens, Bo; Watkins, Michael; Grayson, Michael (2011). The Eponym Dictionary of Reptiles. Baltimore: Johns Hopkins University Press. xiii + 296 pp. . (Gekko grossmanni', p. 109).</ref>

Geographic rangeG. grossmanni is found in Khánh Hòa Province, southern Vietnam.

Habitat

ReproductionG. grossmanni is oviparous.

References

Further reading
Günther R (1994). "Eine neue Art der Gattung Gekko (Reptilia, Squamata, Gekkonidae) aus dem Süden Vietnams ". Zoologischer Anzeiger 233 (1-2): 57-67. (Gekko grossmanni, new species). (in German).
Rösler H (2000). "Kommentierte Liste der rezent, subrezent und fossil bekannten Geckotaxa (Reptilia: Gekkonomorpha)". Gekkota 2: 28–153. (Gekko grossmanni'', p. 81). (in German).

Gekko
Reptiles described in 1994
Reptiles of Vietnam